Andy Barton may refer to:

Andy Barton (wrestler); see Irish Whip Wrestling
Andy Barton (footballer), NZ footballer; see 2010–11 ASB Premiership
Andy Barton (racing driver); see 1978 British Formula One season

See also
Andrew Barton (disambiguation)